Mahatma Gandhi University, West Bengal is a university in Mahishadal, Purba Medinipur district, West Bengal. The university was established in 2018 as Purba Medinipur University under The Purba Medinipur University Act, 2017. In 2018 it was renamed through The Purba Medinipur University (Amendment) Act, 2018. It became active with the appointment of the first vice-chancellor, Subrata Kumar De, in November 2020. It offers education in Bengali, English, History and Mathematics.

See also
 List of universities in West Bengal
 Education in India
 Education in West Bengal

References

External links

Universities and colleges in Purba Medinipur district
Universities and colleges in West Bengal
Educational institutions established in 2020
Purba Medinipur district
2020 establishments in West Bengal